St Johnston Cricket Club is a cricket club in St Johnston, County Donegal, Ireland, playing in North West Championship.

Founded in 1898, the club was the first North Western team to win the Irish Senior Cup, in 1987.

Honours
Irish Senior Cup: 1
1987
North West Senior League: 2
1984 2019
North West Senior Cup: 5
1959, 1975, 1978, 1982, 2019

References

External links
St Johnston Cricket Club

North West Senior League members
1898 establishments in Ireland
Cricket clubs in County Donegal
Cricket clubs established in 1898